Alan Uger (born December 24, 1940) is an American writer and producer, known for Family Ties, Blazing Saddles, and Champs. He was nominated three times for Outstanding Writer in a Comedy Series for Family Ties, in 1985, 1986 and 1987; winning in 1987. 

Uger was a dentist before becoming a writer, and worked with Norman Steinberg on several projects until Steinberg got hired by Mel Brooks as a writer on Blazing Saddles (1974), with Uger also hired as co-writer. Between 1972 and 1996, Uger wrote or produced dozens of TV show episodes or screenplays. Uger was also nominated for BAFTA and WGA awards.

References

External links 

1940 births
American male screenwriters
American male television writers
American television writers
Primetime Emmy Award winners
American television producers
Living people
20th-century American screenwriters
20th-century American male writers